Living Hell (aka Organizm - DVD title) is a 2008 horror television film written and directed by Richard Jefferies, which stars Johnathon Schaech and Erica Leerhsen. It premiered on Sci Fi Channel on February 23,  and was released on DVD on June 10, 2008.

Budgeted at an estimated $4,500,000, the film was shot in only 29 days.

Plot
In 1969, ten-year-old Frank Sears is confronted by his hysterical mother Eleanore, who carves the message "S3 V12" into the palms of his hands with a pencil and warns him to never forget her warning before murdering her husband and committing suicide.

In the present, Frank (Johnathon Schaech) is now a biology teacher haunted by the night his mother died. Having tried to forget about her warnings, he conducted an internet search that led him to drive all the way from New Jersey to the town of Bennell, New Mexico in an attempt to visit the Army base Fort Lambert. After being turned away he is forced to break through the gates of the base and is detained, at which point he explains his story to Carrie Freeborn (Erica Leerhsen) and her wheelchair-bound husband Glenn (Jason Wiles): his mother once worked at the base and warned him that something terrible was stored there, in "Sublevel 3, Vault 12." The Freeborns find no evidence of Elenore Sears in their records, and their documents of the base's decontamination indicate that the vault was empty. However, on another check, they discover the back wall is hollow and immediately begin excavation against Frank's warnings. Inside is a sealed tank, and on the orders of Colonel Erik Maitland (James McDaniel) a quarantine is set up so the tank can be opened by Carrie's team, consisting of herself, Torbin Struss (Josh Berry), Gayle Osterloh (Liezl Carstens) and Aneta McQueen (Charissa Allen).

They discover a man's corpse with evidence of disease inside, but when Carrie attempts to biopsy the infected tissue, the infection comes alive in the form of giant, rapidly growing plantlike roots. Struss is immediately killed when he tries to bolt the tank closed, and the organism grows out of the room in moments. An evacuation is declared, but Glen, Osterloh and many other soldiers are killed. Carrie frees Frank and confronts him with images of the man in the tank, but he is unresponsive. The soldiers withdraw into Bennell to form a response, and Frank realizes that Carrie meant that the man in the tank was his real father.

Frank and Carrie seek out Virgil Redwing (Lew Alexander), a shopowner who Frank thought recognized him when he asked for directions earlier. They learn that Virgil, Frank's father and Eleanore all worked at the base in 1958 and recover a package left to Virgil before Frank's father died. However, the organism reaches the abandoned church and kills Virgil. Frank and Carrie rescue Virgil's granddaughter Kaz (Haleigh Sanderson) and discover a film inside the package. Kaz advises them they can find a projector at her school, where the town has been evacuated to.

At the school, Frank and Carrie watch the film within the package, which is of Frank's father Yevgeni Tarasov (also played by Schaech), a Russian scientist who defected to the US and accidentally created the organism within his own body. Frank is infected by a sample given to Carrie by an elderly resident, but the organism dies within his body; he realizes that his blood possesses antibodies that can kill the organism due to his heritage.

The town is evacuated, and before his death, General Kenneth Lavigne (Rick Herod) orders a nuclear strike. However, Carrie and Frank realize this will cause disaster, as the organism can use any heat or light to grow further. Frank covers Carrie in his blood for protection and they fly in a stolen helicopter back to Fort Lambert so they can kill the organism. Inside, Carrie finds a boil on the vines with Glen's body inside and accidentally bursts it, washing off the blood. However, before she is killed, Frank uses his blood to kill the nucleus in his father's body. The nuclear strike is averted and the world is saved. Maitland, realizing they may have survived, sends an evacuation in to rescue them.

Cast
 Johnathon Schaech as Frank Sears
Schaech also appears as Yevgeni Tarasov, the father of Frank Sears
Angelo Martinez as Young Frank Sears
 Erica Leerhsen as Carrie Freeborn
 James McDaniel as Colonel Erik Maitland
 Jason Wiles as Glenn Freeborn
 Terence Jay as Sergeant Arbogast
 Charissa Allen as Private First Class Aneta McQueen
 Dylan Kenin as Sergeant Teegarden
 Jude Herrera as Private First Class Una Fernandes
 Vic Chao as Sergeant Kinoshita
 Josh Berry as Torbin Struss
 Daniel Beer as Tristam Sears
 Rick Herod as General Kenneth Lavigne
 Joshua Rollins as Kermit Shourt
 Darlene Kegan as Eleanore Sears
 Liezl Carstens as Gayle Osterloh
 Lew Alexander as Virgil Redwing
 Haleigh Sanderson as Kaz Redwing
 Fredrick Lopez as Perry Redwing
 John Weitz as PA Announcer (voice)
 Daniel Hubbert as Air Traffic Controller
 Brad Hulleman as Army Soldier

Rick Herod's character is named after the famous Canadian singer/actress Avril Lavigne.

External links
 
 
 

2008 television films
American science fiction horror films
2008 horror films
2008 films
Syfy original films
Films set in 1969
American science fiction television films
American horror television films
2000s English-language films
2000s American films